Meshir 1 - Coptic Calendar - Meshir 3

The second day of the Coptic month of Meshir, the sixth month of the Coptic year. On a common year, this day corresponds to January 27, of the Julian Calendar, and February 9, of the Gregorian Calendar. This day falls in the Coptic Season of Shemu, the season of the Harvest.

Commemorations

Saints 

 The departure of Saint Paul the Great, the First Hermit 
 The departure of Saint Longinus, the Abbot of el-Zugag Monastery

References 

Days of the Coptic calendar